Calliandra comosa is a species of plant in the family Fabaceae. It is found only in Jamaica.

References

comosa
Vulnerable plants
Endemic flora of Jamaica
Taxonomy articles created by Polbot
Plants described in 1788